Jack Morrell may refer to:

Jack Morrell (boxer) (born 1955), American boxer
Jack Morrell (historian of science), University of Leeds, England